GJ 1128 is a red dwarf star of spectral type M4.0V, located in constellation Carina  away from Earth.  It is one of the closer stars to the Sun.

History of observations
The discovery designation of GJ 1128 is L 100-115, related to time period 1942–1944. The small distance from Sun to the GJ 1128 was recognized in 2005.

Physical properties
GJ 1128 is a long-term variable with the prominent 5-year starspot cycle comparable to that of Sun`s.

References

Carina (constellation)
M-type main-sequence stars
J09424635-6853060
1128